No.0 is the twenty-first studio album by Japanese rock band Buck-Tick, released on March 14, 2018 by the label Lingua Sounda, subdivision of the label Victor Entertainment. It peaked 2nd on the Oricon chart, and 5th on Billboard Japan.

Imai said that this would be a "clean break" from what the band has already done, and its keywords are "minimalism" and "electronic". The album was released in three editions: the regular edition, with 13 tracks, the limited edition A and B, with three bonus video clips, and the limited edition C, an exclusive edition that makes the music video clips available in VR format.

Tracklist

Personnel 
 Atsushi Sakurai - vocal
 Hisashi Imai - lead guitar, vocal
 Hidehiko Hoshino - rhythm guitar
 Yutaka Higuchi - bass guitar
 Toll Yagami - drums

References

External links
 
 

Buck-Tick albums
Japanese-language albums
2018 albums